Guy Potter (born 25 April 1992) is a British actor, director and producer. He has featured in film, television and stage alongside working under his company High Sierra Films.

Early life 
Potter was born in Cheltenham, Gloucestershire in 1992. Potter attended Blundell's School in Devon, where he began performing in school productions and his class' self-scripted play The Importance of Being a Man, which was invited to go to the National Student Drama Festival (2010). Inspired by a school visit from Nina Gold for an audition for Steven Spielberg's War Horse, he decided to take acting seriously as a profession.

Career

Acting 
After moving to London, Potter first appeared in small parts in productions such as Maleficent, Avengers: Age of Ultron and Mission Impossible: Rogue Nation in which he also worked as a Stand-In for Jeremy Renner's character Brandt.

In 2015, after several years experience in the industry, Potter left to study at the American Academy of Dramatic Arts in Los Angeles, studying under Scott Reiniger, star of Dawn of The Dead (1978). He was also accepted into the National Youth Film Academy in London studying under Rafael Kapelinski, the director of Butterfly Kisses (2017). This was also the year of his television debut on an episode of Endeavour as Gerald Ashbourne, a victim of heroin addiction.

In Summer 2016, Potter was brought on board to Steven Spielberg's Ready Player One to work as a stand-in/double for Tye Sheridan. He was also cast as Leonard in Magpie and was invited to attend the 73rd Venice International Film Festival.

In 2017 he was cast in a lead role of 'Dan' in Felipe Torres Urso's directorial debut Sleeping Arrangements.

In 2018, he was cast as 'Tank' and other NPC's in Tom Clancy's The Division 2. Later in the year, Potter was cast in a supporting role in the BBC drama MotherFatherSon, sharing a scene with Richard Gere.

In 2019 he began pre-production on his directorial debut, Together As None and was accepted onto a mentorship programme under the Sundance Film Festival.

Directing 
In early 2017, Potter directed his first commercial under High Sierra Films, filming in the Swiss Alps.

In 2018, as a creative duo, Potter and Andrew Zographos re-wrote much of Together As None throughout the year and on September 4 revealed on BBC Bristol that the title would be Together As None.

In 2019, Potter approached the Sundance Institute for support with the project and was accepted alongside 30 other applicant's to take part in the Sundance Collaboration programme. This also lead him to making the short Prey.
He has continued involvement with Sundance and now in 2021 is in the final stages of pre-production on two films, both 'Together As None' and his self-written film Trengellick Rising.

Producing 
In December 2015, Potter formed his production company High Sierra Films.

In 2016 he teamed up with French 75 to create his first co-produced venture Whatever the Weather which aired on BBC Points West and ITV News. It was also sent to the Sundance Film Festival.

In late 2017, Andrew Zographos approached Potter for a role in a film that he would eventually go on to produce as well as direct under High Sierra Films in conjunction with Quantum Pictures. Production began in early 2019 and he revealed on BBC Bristol it would be called Together As None. Principal photography is due to begin in Summer 2020.

See also 
 List of directorial debuts
 List of British actors

References

External links 
 
 
 High Sierra Films
 Guy Potter at Spotlight

21st-century English male actors
1992 births
Living people
People from Cheltenham
Male actors from Gloucestershire
American Academy of Dramatic Arts alumni
British actors